Tatura railway station is a closed railway station on the Toolamba–Echuca railway line, in Victoria, Australia, formerly serving the town of Tatura. The former platform mound remains adjacent to the large dairy farm at Tatura. The track contains a kink near the former station site, where the rail yard area once was. There is a semaphore signal at the up end of the station. The station officially closed on 8 April 1991.

References

Disused railway stations in Victoria (Australia)